TP Formula is an auto racing team based in Italy.

References

External links
Official Website

Italian auto racing teams
Italian Formula 3 teams
Auto GP teams